The 16th season of Taniec z gwiazdami, the Polish edition of Dancing With the Stars, started on 6 March 2015.
This is the third season aired on Polsat. Krzysztof Ibisz and Anna Głogowska returned as hosts and Beata Tyszkiewicz, Iwona Pavlović, Michał Malitowski and Andrzej Grabowski returned as judges.

On 22 May, Krzysztof Wieszczek and his partner Agnieszka Kaczorowska were crowned the champions.

Couples

Scores

Red numbers indicate the lowest score for each week.
Green numbers indicate the highest score for each week.
 indicates the couple eliminated that week.
 indicates the returning couple that finished in the bottom two.
 indicates the returning couple that was the last to be called safe.
 indicates the couple saved from elimination by immunity
 indicates the winning couple.
 indicates the runner-up.
 indicates the couple in third place.

Notes

Week 1: Tatiana Okupnik scored 39 out of 40 on her first dance (Rumba). It was the highest score ever in Week 1. Agnieszka Sienkiewicz and Anna Wyszkoni albo got 39 points in Week 1 in Season 15. Norbi got the lowest score in history of the show, scoring 13 out of 40 for his Cha Cha Cha. It was also the lowest score ever for Cha-cha-cha. Michał Szpak (Week 9 & 10) and Zbigniew Urbański (Week 1) albo got 13 points in Season 13. Wojciech & Paulina were eliminated despite being 12 points from the bottom.

Week 2: Tatiana Okupnik received the first perfect score of the season for her Cha-cha-cha. It was the highest score ever in Week 2. Marcin Najman got 26 points for his Rumba, making it the lowest score of the week. Marcin & Hanna were eliminated.

Week 3: All couples danced to songs from movies. Julia Pogrebińska scored 39 out of 40 for her Jive, making it the highest score in this episode. Norbi got 20 points for his Jive, making it the lowest score of the week. Norbi & Nina were eliminated.

Week 4: Tatiana Okupnik scored 39 out of 40 for her Jive, making it the highest score in this episode. Kamila Szczawińska got 25 points for her Rumba, making it the lowest score of the week. Kamila & Robert were eliminated.

Week 5: All couples danced to national style. Ada Fijał scored 38 out of 40 for her Viennese Waltz, making it the highest score in this episode. Krzysztof Wieszczek got 27 points for his Cha-cha-cha, making it the lowest score of the week. There were also two team dances. The teams were chosen by the winner and runner-up couples in 4th episode. Tatiana's Team received 37 out of 40 for their Taniec Góralski. Julia's Team received 38 out of 40 for their Krakowiak. Łukasz & Magdalena were eliminated despite being 6 points from the bottom.

Week 6: It was Switch – Up Night. Tatiana Okupnik received her second perfect score for the Quickstep. Grzegorz Łapanowski got 29 points for his Foxtrot, making it the lowest score of the week. There were no elimination.

Week 7: Julia Pogrebińska received the first perfect score for her Paso Doble. Ewa Kasprzyk got 25 points for her Charleston, making it the lowest score of the week. There were also Rock and Roll maraton. Julia Pogrebińska scored 7 out of 7 in the maraton. Grzegorz & Valeriya were eliminated despite being 4 points from the bottom. Ada & Krzysztof were albo eliminated despite being 10 points from the bottom.

Week 8: Tatiana Okupnik scored 39 out of 40 for her Rumba, making it the highest score in this episode. Ewa Kasprzyk got 30 points for her Broadway, making it the lowest score of the week. Sylwia & Kamil were eliminated despite being 7 points from the bottom.

Week 9: Krzysztof Wieszczek scored 39 out of 40 for his Waltz, making it the highest score in this episode. Julia Pogrebińska albo scored 39 out of 40 for her Freestyle. Ewa Kasprzyk got 29 points for her Paso Doble, making it the lowest score of the week. Ewa & Jan were eliminated.

Week 10: Julia Pogrebińska received her second perfect score for the Tango. Tatiana Okupnik received her third perfect score for the Contemporary. Krzysztof Wieszczek received his 1st and 2nd perfect score for the Foxtrot and Medley. Krzysztof Wieszczek albo got 3 points for his Jive, making it the lowest score of the week. Julia & Rafał were eliminated despite being 1 point from the bottom.

Week 11: Both couples had to perform three dances: their favorite dance, judges's choice dance and a Freestyle. Tatiana Okupnik received her 4th and 5th perfect score for the Samba and Showdance. Krzysztof Wieszczek received his 3rd perfect score for the Viennese Waltz. Krzysztof & Agnieszka won the competition. This is the 10th time the winner was not on the first place according to the judges' scoreboard. Krzysztof Wieszczek became a 5th man in history to win the program since Kacper Kuszewski won Season 13 of the show.

Average score chart
This table only counts for dances scored on a traditional 40-points scale.

Highest and lowest scoring performances
The best and worst performances in each dance according to the judges' 40-point scale are as follows:

Couples' highest and lowest scoring dances

According to the traditional 40-point scale:

Weekly scores
Unless indicated otherwise, individual judges scores in the charts below (given in parentheses) are listed in this order from left to right: Andrzej Grabowski, Iwona Pavlović, Beata Tyszkiewicz and Michał Malitowski.

Week 1: Season Premiere

Running order

Week 2: Personal Stories
Individual judges scores in the charts below (given in parentheses) are listed in this order from left to right: Andrzej Grabowski, Iwona Pavlović, Beata Tyszkiewicz and Robert Kupisz.

Running order

Week 3: Movie Week

Running order

Week 4: Pro Dancers

Running order

Week 5: Around the World

The teams were chosen by the winner and runner-up couples in 4th episode –  Tatiana & Tomasz and Julia & Rafał.

Running order

Week 6: Partners Switch – Up

Running order

Week 7: Marathon Week

Running order

Week 8: New Dance Styles

Running order

Week 9: Dynamic Duos

Running order

Week 10: Trio Challenge (Semifinal)

Running order

Week 11: Season Finale

Running order

Other Dances

Dance chart
The celebrities and professional partners danced one of these routines for each corresponding week:
Week 1 (Season Premiere): Cha-cha-cha, Waltz, Rumba, Quickstep, Jive, Tango, Foxtrot, Paso Doble, Samba, Salsa, Viennese Waltz, Contemporary
Week 2 (Personal Story Night): One unlearned dance (introducing Jazz, Swing, American Smooth)
Week 3 (Movie Night): One unlearned dance
Week 4 (Pro Dancers Night): One unlearned dance (introducing Charleston)
Week 5 (Around the World Night): One unlearned dance and Team Dance Freestyle
Week 6 (Switch-Up Night): One unlearned dance
Week 7 (Marathon Night): One unlearned dance and Rock and Roll marathon
Week 8 (New Dance Styles Special): One repeated dance and one unlearned uncommon dance (Broadway, Dancehall, Hip-hop, Disco)
Week 9 (Dynamic Duos Night): One repeated dance from week 6 and Freestyle
Week 10 (Semifinal: Trio Challenge): One unlearned dance (trio dances), one repeated dance and improvised medley
Week 11 (Season Finale): Judges' choice, Showdance and couple's favorite unlearned dance.

 Highest scoring dance
 Lowest scoring dance
 Performed, but not scored

Call-out order

 This couple came in first place with the judges.
 This couple came in last place with the judges.
 This couple came in last place with the judges and was eliminated.
 This couple was eliminated.
 This couple was saved from elimination by immunity.
 This couple won the competition.
 This couple came in second in the competition.
 This couple came in third in the competition.

Guest performances

Rating figures

References

External links
 

Season 16
2015 Polish television seasons